St Colman's Park is a football stadium in Cobh, County Cork. It is home to Cobh Ramblers F.C. of the League of Ireland First Division. 

The stadium was redeveloped during the mid-2000s. Construction on a new changing facility and press office along with a new chairman's office was completed in 2006 along with new floodlights and a 900-seater stand replacing the old shed. The east stand, too was improved with 450 new seats being installed. A new surface was also added prior to the clubs admission to the Eircom/Airtricity League Premier Division in 2009.

The stadium has hosted international underage games including games in the 1994 UEFA European Under-16 Football Championship qualifiers.

Munster Schools Senior Cup games have also been staged at the stadium including the final which was won by local Cobh school, Coláiste Muire in 2010.

References

 

Association football venues in the Republic of Ireland
Cobh Ramblers F.C.
Association football in County Cork
Sports venues in County Cork
Cobh
1968 establishments in Ireland
Sports venues completed in 1968